The Källén–Lehmann spectral representation gives a general expression for the (time ordered) two-point function of an interacting quantum field theory as a sum of free propagators. It was discovered by Gunnar Källén and Harry Lehmann independently. This can be written as, using the mostly-minus metric signature,

where  is the spectral density function that should be positive definite. In a gauge theory, this latter condition cannot be granted but nevertheless a spectral representation can be provided. This belongs to non-perturbative techniques of quantum field theory.

Mathematical derivation

The following derivation employs the mostly-minus metric signature. 

In order to derive a spectral representation for the propagator of a field , one consider a complete set of states  so that, for the two-point function one can write

We can now use Poincaré invariance of the vacuum to write down

Let us introduce the spectral density function

.

It is immediate to realize that the spectral density function is real and positive. So, one can write

and we freely interchange the integration, this should be done carefully from a mathematical standpoint but here we ignore this, and write this expression as

where

.

where now

a free particle propagator. Now, as we have the exact propagator given by the chronologically ordered two-point function, we have obtained the spectral decomposition.

References

Bibliography

Quantum field theory